Utani Apu (Aymara) is a   mountain in the Andes of Bolivia. It is located in the La Paz Department, Ingavi Province, San Andrés de Machaca Municipality, and in the Pacajes Province, Caquiaviri Municipality.

References 

Mountains of La Paz Department (Bolivia)